Time Remembers One Time Once is a live album by pianist Denny Zeitlin and bassist Charlie Haden recorded at Keystone Korner in 1981 and released on the ECM label.

Reception 

The album received strong reviews in the United States and Europe. "The occasional over-modulation in this recording doesn't detract from the outstanding performances and this CD should be essential for fans of either Denny Zeitlin and/or Charlie Haden", wrote Ken Dryden on the website Allmusic.  He gave the album 4 stars.

Track listing
 "Chairman Mao" (Charlie Haden) - 6:35 
 "Bird Food" (Ornette Coleman) - 9:53 
 "As Long as There's Music" (Sammy Cahn, Jule Styne) - 6:53 
 "Time Remembers One Time Once" (Denny Zeitlin) - 4:27 
 "Love for Sale" (Cole Porter) - 7:04 
 "Ellen David" (Charlie Haden) -  6:37 
 "Satellite/How High the Moon" (John Coltrane/Nancy Hamilton, Morgan Lewis) - 8:05 
 "The Dolphin" (Luiz Eça) - 4:06 
Recorded at Keystone Korner in San Francisco, California in July 1981

Personnel
Denny Zeitlin — piano
Charlie Haden — bass

References 

ECM Records live albums
Charlie Haden live albums
1983 live albums
Albums produced by Manfred Eicher
Albums recorded at Keystone Korner